WIOZ can refer to:

 WIOZ (AM), a radio station at 550 AM located in Pinehurst, North Carolina
 WIOZ-FM, a radio station at 102.5 FM located in Southern Pines, North Carolina